Nijensleek is a village in the Dutch province of Drenthe. It is a part of the municipality of Westerveld, and lies about 5 km north of Steenwijk.

The village was first mentioned in 1402 as Nyensleker bure, and means "new natural stream". Nijensleek is a road village which developed in the Late Middle Ages as a peat excavation settlement.

Nijensleek was home to 363 people in 1840. In 1934, a Reformed Church was built as an aisleless church with ridge turret.

References

Populated places in Drenthe
Westerveld